William Mitchell Morgan (August 1, 1870 – September 17, 1935) was an American politician who served five terms as a U.S. Representative from Ohio from 1921 to 1931.

Early life and career 
Born in Brownsville, Ohio, Morgan attended the public schools.
He pursued various occupations until 1898, when he moved to Newark, Ohio.
He was employed as a laborer and later as a musician.
He studied literature and science.
He engaged in agriculture, merchandising, and the wool-buying business.
He was active in organized labor movements, serving as president of the Newark (Ohio) Musicians' Union.

Congress 
Morgan was elected as a Republican to the Sixty-seventh and to the four succeeding Congresses (March 4, 1921 – March 3, 1931).
He was an unsuccessful candidate for reelection in 1930 to the Seventy-second Congress and for election in 1932 to the Seventy-third Congress.

Later career and death 
He resumed his former business pursuits.
He served as president of the Ohio State Federation of Labor in 1935, resigning the same year to become a member of the state industrial commission, in which he served until his death in Columbus, Ohio, on September 17, 1935.
He was interred in Cedar Hill Cemetery, Newark, Ohio.

Sources

1870 births
1935 deaths
American Federation of Labor people
Musicians from Ohio
Politicians from Newark, Ohio
Burials at Cedar Hill Cemetery, Newark, Ohio
Republican Party members of the United States House of Representatives from Ohio